Shiba Inu token (ticker: SHIB) is a decentralized cryptocurrency created in August 2020 by an anonymous person or group known as "Ryoshi". It is named after the Shiba Inu (柴犬), a Japanese breed of dog originating in the Chūbu region, the same breed that is depicted in Dogecoin's symbol, itself originally a satirical cryptocurrency based on the Doge meme. Shiba Inu has been characterized as a "meme coin" and a pump-and-dump scheme. There have also been concerns about the concentration of the coin with a single "whale" wallet controlling billions of dollars' worth of the token, and frenzied buying by retail investors motivated by fear of missing out (FOMO).

Shiba Inu was created in August 2020, dubbing itself the 'Dogecoin killer'. On 13 May 2021, Vitalik Buterin donated more than 50 trillion SHIB (worth over $1 billion at the time) to the India COVID-Crypto Relief Fund.

In early October 2021, the exchange price of the cryptocurrency notably surged. Its value increased 240% over the week. However, at the beginning of November the price dropped and continued to fall, ending the month having lost approximately 55% of its value.

See also  
 Meme coin 
 Dogecoin

References

External links 

Cryptocurrency projects
Computer-related introductions in 2020